Dzhavgat (Kaitag and Dargwa: Жавгъат) is a rural locality (a selo) and the administrative centre of Dzhavgatsky Selsoviet, Kaytagsky District, Republic of Dagestan, Russia. The population was 2,189 as of 2010. There are 7 streets.

Geography 
Dzhavgat is located 23 km southeast of Madzhalis (the district's administrative centre) by road. Ruka and Dzhibakhni are the nearest rural localities.

Nationalities 
Dargins live there.

References 

Rural localities in Kaytagsky District